Neurocalcin is a neuronal calcium-binding protein that belongs to the neuronal calcium sensor (NCS) family of proteins. It expressed in mammalian brains. It possesses a Ca2+/myristoyl switch

The subclass of neurocalcins are brain-specific proteins that fit into the EF-hand superfamily of calcium binding proteins.  The NCS family were defined by the photoreceptor cell-specific protein, recoverin. Neurocalcin was purified from the bovine brain by using calcium-dependent drug affinity chromatography.  The amino acid sequence showed that neurocalcin has three functional calcium binding sites.  It is expressed in the central nervous system, retina, and adrenal gland.  With this unique pattern of expression it is thought that neurcalcin offers a different physiological role than similar proteins visinin and recoverin.

Neurocalcin delta an isoform of Neurocalcin is known to regulate adult neurogenesis ( Upadhyay et al., 2019)

External links
 
NCS proteins
 Protein Database Page

References

Proteins